Axmarby is a smaller locality in Gävle Municipality, Sweden. It has an athletics club called Axmarby IF.

References

Populated places in Gävle Municipality
Gästrikland